Shashikumar Madhusudan Chitre FNA, FASc, FNASc, FRAS (7 May 1936 – 11 January 2021) was an Indian mathematician and astrophysicist, known for his research in Astronomy and Astrophysics. The Government of India honored him, in 2012, with Padma Bhushan, the third highest civilian award, for his services to the sciences.

Biography

Shashikumar Chitre graduated in Mathematics from the Elphinstone College, Mumbai, in 1956, on completion of which he was awarded the Duke of Edinburgh Scholarship to study abroad. He joined Peterhouse, University of Cambridge and did another bachelor's degree in 1959. In 1960, he was selected as the Peterhouse Scholar, with which he completed his master's degree. Subsequently, he got selected for Gulbenkian Research studentship, moved to Churchill College and obtained his PhD from the Department of Applied Mathematics and Theoretical Physics of Cambridge, in 1963.

Chitre started his career as a lecturer at the University of Leeds, in 1963, and worked there till 1966 when he obtained another fellowship to join the California Institute of Technology, Pasadena. In 1967, he returned to India and joined the faculty of Tata Institute of Fundamental Research, which served as the base of his research till his retirement in 2001. He lived in Mumbai, attending to his duties as the Academic Chair Person and professor emeritus of the Centre for Excellence in Basic Sciences (CBS) and the INSA Honorary Scientist at the University of Mumbai. He was also on the board of Trustees of JN Tata Trust and worked as an Honorary Executive Director of Homi Bhabha Fellowship Council.

Chitre died on 11 January 2021, aged 84.

Research highlights
Chitre's scientific research was focused on solar physics, astrophysics and gravitational lensing. He performed extensive research on the Sun's magnetic activity cycle, the solar dynamo theory, and the role of neutrinos in the solar atmosphere.

Positions held
Sashikumar Chitre has been honored by fellowships by many prominent scientific institutions.
 MaxPlanck Fellow at the Max Planck Institute for Extraterrestrial Physics
 Indian Academy of Sciences
 Indian National Science Academy (1988)
 National Academy of Sciences, India (1992)
 Third World Academy of Sciences (1999)
 Maharashtra Academy of Sciences
 Royal Astronomical Society
 International Astronomical Union

Chitre also served as a visiting fellow or visiting professor at various prestigious institutions around the world.
 UGC National Lecturer in Physics - 1975-76
 Visiting Professor - University of Cambridge
 Visiting Professor - Princeton University
 Visiting Professor - University of Sussex
 Visiting Professor - University of Amsterdam
 Visiting Professor - University of Columbia
 Visiting Professor - University of Virginia
 Visiting Professor - Queen Mary and Westfield College, University of London - 1992-1993, '94-'95 and '97
 Senior Research Associateship at Goddard Space Flight Centre, NASA
 Senior Research Associateship of the National Academy of Sciences, USA
 Visiting Astronomer - Institute of Astronomy, Cambridge - 2003-2005 and 2007
 Perren Visiting Fellow and Visiting Professor - Physical Research Laboratory, Ahmedabad - 1999-2000
 Raja Ramanna Fellow - University of Mumbai - 2001-06.

He has also held the posts of:
 President - Astronomical Society of India
 Chairman — Indian National Committee for Astronomy
 Chairman — Bombay Association for Science Education
 Member, Management Board - National Centre for Radio Astrophysics
 Member, Management Boards - Homi Bhabha Centre for Science Education
 Council Member, - Indian Academy of Sciences, Bangalore
 Council Member, Indian National Science Academy, New Delhi
 Council Member, National Academy of Sciences, Allahabad

Awards and recognitions
 Padma Bhushan - 2012
 Professor A. C. Banerjee Memorial Lecture Award - 1992
 INSA Vainu Bappu Memorial Medal - 1995
 M. P. Birla Award - 1999

Writings

References

External links
 List of Publications on Microsoft Academic Search
 Publications listed on CBS web site
 Profile on Indian Academy of Sciences
 Lecture by Sashikumar Chitre on Outstanding Problems in Astronomy
 Profile on International Astronomical Union

1936 births
2021 deaths
Recipients of the Padma Bhushan in science & engineering
Indian astrophysicists
Cambridge College alumni
Fellows of the Indian National Science Academy
Fellows of the Indian Academy of Sciences
Fellows of The National Academy of Sciences, India
20th-century Indian physicists
20th-century Indian mathematicians